Patek may refer to:

 Patek (surname)
 Pátek, a village and municipality in the Czech Republic
 Patek, Iran, a village in Iran

See also
 
 Patek Philippe, Swiss watchmaker
 Petek (disambiguation)